The 2022–23 Atlantic Coast Conference women's basketball season began with practices in October 2022, followed by the start of the 2022–23 NCAA Division I women's basketball season in November. Conference play started in November 2022 and will conclude on February 26, 2023.  After the regular season, the 2023 ACC women's basketball tournament will be held at the Greensboro Coliseum in Greensboro, NC for the 23rd time in 24 years.

Head coaches

Coaching changes
On March 21, 2022, Sue Semrau announced her retirement after 24 seasons as head coach at Florida State. She was succeeded by Seminoles associate head coach Brooke Wyckoff, who served as the interim head coach for the team during the 2020–21 season during Semrau's leave of absence.

On March 26, 2022, Felisha Legette-Jack was announced as the head coach at Syracuse.  She took over from interim head coach Von Read.

On March 3, 2022 Virginia fired head coach Tina Thompson after four years as head coach and a 30–63 overall record.  On March 21, 2022, Virginia announced that Amaka Agugua-Hamilton would be the new head coach of the program.

On May 11, 2022 Wake Forest fired head coach Jen Hoover after ten seasons.  Megan Gebbia was announced as the new head coach on May 26, 2022.

Coaches 

Notes:
 Year at school includes 2022–23 season.
 Overall and ACC records are from time at current school and are through the end the 2021–22 season.
 NCAA Tournament appearances are from time at current school only.
 NCAA Final Fours and Championship include time at other schools

Preseason

Preseason watch lists 
Below is a table of notable preseason watch lists.

ACC Women's Basketball Tip-off 
The Preseason Media Poll and Preseason All-ACC teams were released after a tipoff event held at the Westin in Charlotte, North Carolina on October 11, 2022.

At the media day, both the head coaches and the Blue Ribbon Panel predicted that Louisville would be league champion.  In prior seasons, the league released a poll of head coaches and a Blue Ribbon Panel poll, but this year those polls were combined.  The votes from the league's head coaches counted twice in the combined poll.

ACC Preseason poll 

 Louisville – 1,068 (31)
 Virginia Tech – 984 (17)
 NC State – 963 (8)
 Notre Dame – 942 (4)
 North Carolina – 895
 Miami – 674
 Duke – 627
 Georgia Tech – 623
 Florida State – 553
 Syracuse – 379
 Virginia – 303
 Clemson – 275
 Boston College – 271
 Wake Forest – 256
 Pittsburgh – 187

First-place votes shown in parenthesis.

Preseason All-ACC Team 

ACC Preseason Player of the Year shown in Bold.
First-place votes shown in parenthesis.

Newcomer Watchlist

Regular season

Records against other conferences
2022–23 records against non-conference foes as of (December 22, 2022):

Regular Season

Post Season

Record against ranked non-conference opponents
This is a list of games against ranked opponents only (rankings from the AP Poll):

{| class="wikitable"
|-
! Date !! Visitor !! Home !! Site !! Significance !! Score !! Conference Record
|- style="background: #ffe6e6;"
| Nov 13 || No. 14 Ohio State || Boston College || Conte Forum • Chestnut Hill, MA || ― || L 64–82 || 0–1
|- style="background: #ffe6e6;"
| Nov 17 || No. 1 South Carolina || Clemson || Littlejohn Coliseum • Clemson, MD || Rivalry || L 31–85 || 0–2
|- style="background: #ffe6e6;"
| Nov 20 || No. 10 NC State || No. 5 UConn || XL Center • Hartford, CT || ― || L 69–91 || 0–3
|- style="background:#ccffcc;"
| Nov 20 || No. 3 Texas || No. 6 Louisville †|| Imperial Arena • Paradise Island, Bahamas || Battle 4 Atlantis || W 71–63 || 1–3
|- style="background:#ccffcc;"
| Nov 24 || No. 18 Oregon || No. 8 North Carolina †|| Chiles Center • Portland, OR || Phil Knight Invitational || W 85–79 || 2–3
|- style="background: #ffe6e6;"
| Nov 24 || No. 25 Kansas State || Clemson †|| Sports and Fitness Center • Saint Thomas, U.S. Virgin Islands || Paradise Jam || L 38–77 || 2–4
|- style="background: #ffe6e6;"
| Nov 25 || Duke || No. 3 UConn †|| Moda Center • Portland, OR || Phil Knight Legacy || L 50–78 || 2–5
|- style="background: #ffe6e6;"
| Nov 27 || Pittsburgh || No. 14 Maryland †|| Suncoast Credit Union Arena • Fort Myers, FL || Fort Myers Tip-Off || L 63–87 || 2–6
|- style="background:#ccffcc;"
| Nov 27 || No. 8 North Carolina || No. 5 Iowa State †|| Moda Center • Portland, OR || Phil Knight Invitational || W 73–64 || 3–6
|- style="background: #ffe6e6;"
| Nov 30 || No. 4 Ohio State || No. 18 Louisville || KFC Yum! Center • Louisville, KY || ACC–Big Ten Women's Challenge || L 77–96 || 3–7 
|- style="background: #ffe6e6;"
| Dec 1 || No. 6 North Carolina || No. 5 Indiana || Simon Skjodt Assembly Hall • Bloomington, IN || ACC–Big Ten Women's Challenge || L 63–87 || 3–8 
|- style="background: #ffe6e6;"
| Dec 1 || No. 20 Maryland || No. 7 Notre Dame || Edmund P. Joyce Center • South Bend, IN || ACC–Big Ten Women's Challenge || L 72–74 || 3–9 
|- style="background:#ccffcc;"
| Dec 1 || No. 12 NC State || No. 10 Iowa || Carver–Hawkeye Arena • Iowa City, IA || ACC–Big Ten Women's Challenge || W 94–81 || 4–9|- style="background: #ffe6e6;"
| Dec 1 || No. 17 Michigan || Miami (FL) || Watsco Center • Coral Gables, FL || ACC–Big Ten Women's Challenge || L 64–76 || 4–10 
|- style="background:#ccffcc;"
| Dec 4 || No. 3 UConn || No. 7 Notre Dame || Edmund P. Joyce Center • South Bend, IN || ― || W 74–60 || 5–10|- style="background: #ffe6e6;"
| Dec 18 || Florida State || No. 9 UConn †|| Mohegan Sun Arena • Uncasville, CT || Basketball Hall of Fame Women's Showcase || L 77–85 || 5–11 
|- style="background: #ffe6e6;"
| Dec 20 || No. 6 North Carolina || No. 19 Michigan †|| Spectrum Center • Charlotte, NC || Jumpman Invitational || L 68–76 || 5–12' 
|}Team rankings are reflective of AP poll when the game was played, not current or final ranking† denotes game was played on neutral site''

Rankings

Note: The Coaches Poll releases a final poll after the NCAA tournament, but the AP Poll does not release a poll at this time.

Conference Matrix
This table summarizes the head-to-head results between teams in conference play. Each team played 18 conference games, and at least 1 against each opponent.

Player of the week
Throughout the conference regular season, the Atlantic Coast Conference offices named a Player(s) of the week and a Rookie(s) of the week.

Postseason

ACC Tournament

NCAA Tournament

National Invitation Tournament

Honors and awards

ACC Awards 

The ACC announced its end of season awards on February 28, 2023 ahead of the start of the ACC tournament.

WNBA Draft

References